Southeastern Chakavian or Ijekavian accent is a dialect of the Chakavian variety of Croatian. It is spoken by the peoples of the diaspora of Lastovo, and on the islands of  Janjina on Pelješac, Bigova on the south of Montenegro.

The Ijekavian accent (Lastovo island, Janjina in Pelješac): */ě/ > /je/ or /ije/

Dialects of Serbo-Croatian